The 1998–99 Cincinnati Bearcats men's basketball team represented University of Cincinnati as a member of Conference USA during the 1998–99 NCAA Division I men's basketball season. The head coach was Bob Huggins, serving in his 10th year at the school. The team won the conference regular season title, but lost in the semifinals of the Conference USA tournament. Playing as No. 3 seed in the East region of the NCAA tournament, Cincinnati defeated George Mason in the opening round before being knocked off by No. 6 seed Temple in the second round. The Bearcats finished with a 27–6 record (12–4 C-USA).

Roster

Schedule and results

|-
!colspan=12 style=|Regular Season 

|-
!colspan=12 style=|Conference USA Tournament 

|-
!colspan=12 style=|NCAA Tournament

Rankings

^Coaches did not release a Week 1 poll.
*AP did not release post-NCAA Tournament rankings

NBA draft selections

References

Cincinnati Bearcats men's basketball seasons
Cincinnati
Cincinnati
Cincin
Cincin